The Hrazdan is a major river and the second largest in Armenia. It originates at the northwest extremity of Lake Sevan and flows south through the Kotayk Province and Armenia's capital, Yerevan; the lake in turn is fed by several streams. In the Ararat plain it joins the Aras river along the border with Turkey. Its waters join the Kura river, before flowing into the Caspian Sea.

A series of hydro-electric plants have been constructed on the river. Its waters are in demand to irrigate crops.

Names
The river was called Ildaruni in Urartian. Its name in Turkic languages is Zangu, Zanga, Zangi, or Zengy.

Geography
The Sevan Lakes (with 30 rivers contributing to its storage), the largest located in the central part of the country and the Hrazdan River which originates from it, together form the "Sevan-Hrazdan Management Area", which is one of the five sub-basins of the 14 sub-basins of Kura and Araks basins of Armenia. The river which flows from the lake in a southern direction passes through a deep gorge as it enters on the western side of the Yerevan city, and then debauchees into the Aras River on the southern side of the city. The geological formations along the river course are made up of lava flows (existing as basalts) generated from three volcanoes in the Gegham range. The lava surfaces represent environments that existed in the form of "lakes, river channels and floodplains". The chronology of landscape of the upper most layer of basalts indicates an age of 200,000 years.

The total flow in the river is 733 million cubic meter. The regulated outflow into the river, which forms the Ararat Valley, is utilized for irrigation and hydro-power benefits.

Fauna
The fauna reported from the river includes 33 species of chironomids and 23 species of blackflies. The chironomids belong to five subfamilies of Tanypodinae, Diamesinae, Prodiamesinae, Orthocladiinae, and Chironominae. 25 species of invertebrates comprising two species of rotifers, 13 species  of cladocerans and 10 species of copepods have been recorded in the river.

While the fish species contained in the lake consist of the Sevan trout (Salmo ischchan) or “Prince Fish,” siga, crucian, carp, crayfish, bojak (Salmo ischchan danilewskii) and winter bakhtak (Salmo ischchan ischchan) and summer bakhtak (Salmo ischchan aestivalis), the river is reported to have species of crayfish as well as karas and crayfish in abundance.

Development

The lake waters have been used for irrigation from the 19th century, and from early 20th century Hydro-power development has also been implemented. The hydro-power development was planned on the river as the Sevan–Hrazdan Cascade involving seven schemes in a  stretch of the river with a total installed capacity of 560 MW with mean annual energy generation of around 500 million kilowatt hours; it is the largest hydro-power generating scheme in Armenia. This scheme was implemented between 1930 and 1962. These are small and medium size projects built as run-of-the river power plants. The seven power stations are: Sevan HEP with installed capacity of 34.2 MW with two units completed in 1949; the Hrazdan HEP of 81.6 MW with two units commissioned in 1959; the Argel HEP with installed capacity of 224 MW completed in 1953; the Arzni HEP with capacity of 70.6 MW with installation of 3 units commissioned in 1956; the Kanaker HEP with installed capacity of 100 MW with 6 units completed in 1936; the Yerevan-1 HEP commissioned in 1962 with installation of 44 MW with 2 units; and the Yerevan-3 with capacity of 5 MW with one unit commissioned in 1960. However, priority of release of water from the lake is for irrigation and accordingly the power stations are operated.

The civil works involved construction of diversion works, open canals or tunnels and power house which over the years were in need of substantial rehabilitation as they were all built around the middle of the twentieth century. In 2003, the International Energy Corporation", a Closed Joint Stock Company, acquired the projects from the Public Services Regulatory Commission of the country under a license No. 0108 for generation of electrical energy. Right from the time of acquisition they started rehabilitating the projects to maximize power generation. The works were completed during 2004. The works were carried out under a US$25 million loan from the Asian Development Bank.

River pollution
The river water is polluted by effluent flows from agricultural, commercial, industrial, and residential development, but particularly by the untreated wastewater from Yerevan. This affects the water quality in the river with dissolved oxygen (DO) levels (less than 5% of the saturated dissolved oxygen level) remaining much lower than the permissible limits. A study carried out in 2008 indicates that a 16 km stretch of the river, from 2 km upstream of the Yerevan waste water outfalls to 14 km below, is insufficiently aerated to provide a healthy environment for aquatic life.

See also

List of rivers of Armenia
List of lakes of Armenia
Geography of Armenia

References

Bibliography

Rivers of Armenia
Geography of Yerevan
Geography of Kotayk Province